Long Island Military Reservation may refer to:

Long Island Military Reservation (Massachusetts), later named Fort Strong
Long Island Military Reservation (Maine), a former military reservation in Maine